Main Street is a 1923 American silent drama film based on the 1920 novel of the same name by Sinclair Lewis. It was produced and distributed by Warner Bros. and directed by Harry Beaumont. A Broadway play version of the novel was produced in 1921. It was the first film to be released after the foundation of Warner Bros. Pictures on April 4, 1923.

Plot
As described in a film magazine review, a young city woman with advanced ideas marries a small town doctor, and go to live in a backwoods burg. Her irritation at the small talk and petty incidents which make up the lives of the townspeople finally culminate in her leaving home and going to work as a government clerk in Washington, D.C. After a time her husband follows her there and there is a reunion.

Cast

Box Office
According to Warner Bros records, the film earned $510,000 domestically and $46,000 foreign.

Preservation status
Main Street is a lost film. Warner Bros. records of the film's negative have a notation, "Junked 12/27/48" (i.e., December 27, 1948). Warner Bros. destroyed many of its negatives in the late 1940s and 1950s due to the nitrate decomposition of its pre-1933 films.

References

External links

Lantern slide (Wayback Machine)
Lobby poster
Series of photos (archived)

1923 films
1923 drama films
Silent American drama films
American silent feature films
Films based on works by Sinclair Lewis
Films directed by Harry Beaumont
Lost American films
American black-and-white films
1923 lost films
Lost drama films
1920s American films